Marian Machowski (1 October 1932 – 5 January 2022) was a Polish footballer and researcher specialising in the field of mining and mining machinery. As a footballer, he played as a right winger, spending most of his career with Wisła Kraków. He made one appearance for the Poland national team in 1956.

Career
Born in Kraków on 1 October 1932, Machowski was the son of a footballer who played for Lauda Kraków. He lived with his family in Ludwinów and later in Kazimierz. After World War II, he became a player of Nadwiślana Kraków before joining Wisła Kraków. At Wisła Kraków, Machowski first played for the club's reserve team and then, from 1953, for the first team. He made 194 appearances scoring 17 goals, of which 181 appearances and 14 goals came in the league. He made one appearance for the Poland national team in 1956, appearing in a 2–1 loss against Bulgaria in Wrocław. He ended his career at ACC Eagles Chicago.

Style of play
A right winger, Machowski was known for his stamina, speed and creativity. Gazeta Krakowska described him as a "brave, relentless and aggressive" player.

Post-playing life
After retiring from playing, Machowski became a coach at his former Wisła Kraków, leading the reserve and junior teams. In the late 1960s he was also an assistant to first team coach Mieczysław Gracz.

During his time as a footballer, Machowski graduated from AGH University of Science and Technology, a technical university in Kraków, and became a researcher specialising in the field of mining and mining machinery. He received various awards and distinctions for his teaching and research work in the field of monument protection, including the Gold Cross of Merit. He had 72 scientific works and seven patents to his name.

Machowski died on 5 January 2022, at the age of 89.

References

1932 births
2022 deaths
Footballers from Kraków
Polish footballers
Association football midfielders
Poland international footballers
Wisła Kraków players
Wisła Kraków non-playing staff